Agron is a given name. It is a popular male Albanian name.

History
Agron appears as a name in Rider's English-Latin reference dictionary of the 17th century, with the entry reading: "Agron, ita dict. quod in agris natus esset. The name of a King; also a Physitian." The Latin translates to "so-called he who was born in the countryside". Similar later works, including by Robert Ainsworth and Thomas Mortimer, focused more on the physician bearing the name (now known in English as Acron), writing how he was said to have set large fires around Athens and successfully stopped the Plague of Athens.

People
Agron of Illyria, King of the Ardiaean Illyrian Kingdom from 250 BC to 230 BC
Agron Abdullahu, a suspect in the 2007 Fort Dix attack plot
Agron Bajrami (born 1964), Kosovo journalist
Agron Haxhihyseni, Albanian retired weightlifter 
Agron Idrizi, bass guitarist for Albanian band Elita 5
Agron Musaraj, Albanian politician
Agron Papuli (born 1955), Albanian businessman
Agron Preteni (born 1990), Croatian kickboxer
Agron Rufati (born 1999), Croatia-born Macedonian footballer
Agron Sulaj (1952–1996), Albanian footballer and coach

References

Masculine given names
Albanian masculine given names